Sigmagraptidae is an extinct family of graptolites.

Genera
List of genera from Maletz (2014):

†Acrograptus Tzaj, 1969
†Azygograptus Nicholson & Lapworth, 1875 in Nicholson (1875)
†Eoazygograptus Obut & Sennikov, 1984
†Eotetragraptus Bouček & Přibyl, 1951
†Etagraptus Ruedemann, 1904
†Goniograptus M’Coy, 1876
†Hemigoniograptus Jin & Wang, 1977
†Jiangnanograptus Xiao & Chen, 1990
†Jishougraptus Ge, 1988
†Keblograptus Riva, 1992
†Kinnegraptus Skoglund, 1961
†Laxograptus Cooper & Fortey, 1982
†Maeandrograptus Moberg, 1892
†Metazygograptus Obut & Sennikov, 1984
†Oslograptus Jaanusson, 1965
†Paradelograptus Erdtmann, Maletz & Gutiérrez-Marco, 1987
†Paraulograptus Bouček, 1973
†Pendeosalicograptus Jiao, 1981
†Perissograptus Williams & Stevens, 1988
†Praegoniograptus Rickards & Chapman, 1991
†Prokinnegraptus Mu, 1974
†Sigmagraptus Ruedemann, 1904
†Taishanograptus Li & Ge, 1987 in Li, Ge & Chen (1987)
†Trichograptus Nicholson, 1876
†Wuninograptus Ni, 1981
†Yushanograptus Chen, Sun & Han, 1964

References

Graptolites
Prehistoric hemichordate families